Two severe power outages affected most of northern and eastern India on 30 and 31 July 2012. The 30 July 2012 blackout affected over 400 million people and was briefly the largest power outage in history by number of people affected, beating the January 2001 blackout in Northern India (230 million affected). The blackout on 31 July is the largest power outage in history. The outage affected more than 620 million people, about 9% of the world population, or half of India's population, spread across 22 states in Northern, Eastern, and Northeast India. An estimated 32 gigawatts of generating capacity was taken offline. Of the affected population, 320 million initially had power, while the rest lacked direct access. Electric service was restored in the affected locations between 31 July and 1 August 2012.

Background 
India is the world's third largest producer and consumer of electricity after the United States and China; however, the electrical infrastructure was unreliable in those days. The northern electrical grid had previously collapsed in 2001. In 2012, an estimated 27% of energy generated was lost in transmission or stolen, while peak supply fell short of demand by an average of 9%. During that period, the nation suffered from frequent power outages that lasted as long as 10 hours and about 25% of the population, about 300 million people, had no electricity at all. Efforts are underway to reduce transmission and distribution losses and increase production.

Sequence of events

30 July 
At 02:35 IST (21:05 UTC on 29 July), circuit breakers on the 400 kV Bina-Gwalior line tripped. As this line fed into the Agra-Bareilly transmission section, breakers at the station also tripped, and power failures cascaded through the grid. All major power stations were shut down in the affected states, causing an estimated shortage of 32 GW. Officials described the failure as "the worst in a decade".

On the day of the collapse, Power Minister Sushilkumar Shinde stated that the exact cause of the failure was unknown, but that at the time of the failure, electricity use was "above normal". He speculated that some states had attempted to draw more power than permitted due to the higher consumption. Spokesperson for PowerGrid Corporation of India Limited (PGCIL) and the Northern Regional Load Dispatch Centre (NRLDC) stated that Uttar Pradesh, Punjab and Haryana were the states responsible for the overdraw. PGCIL's chairman also stated that electrical service was restored "at a record time".

A senior director for an Indian power company described the outage as "a fairly large breakdown that exposed major technical faults in India's grid system. Something went terribly wrong which caused the backup safety systems to fail."

More than 300 million people, about 25% of India's population, were without power. Railways and some airports were shut down until 08:00. The busiest airport in South Asia, Delhi Airport, continued functioning because it switched to back-up power in 15 seconds. The outage caused "chaos" for Monday morning rush hour, as passenger trains were shut down and traffic signals were non-operational. Trains stalled for three to five hours. Several hospitals reported interruptions in health services, while others relied on back-up generators. Water treatment plants were shut down for several hours, and hundreds of thousands of people were unable to draw water from wells powered by electric pumps.

The Associated Chambers of Commerce and Industry of India (ASSOCHAM) stated that the blackout had "severely impacted" businesses, leaving many unable to operate. Oil refineries in Panipat, Mathura and Bathinda continued operating because they have their own captive power stations within the refineries and do not depend on the grid.

It took 15 hours to restore 80% of service.

31 July 
The system failed again at 13:02 IST (07:32 UTC), due to a relay problem near the Taj Mahal. As a result, power stations across the affected parts of India again went offline. NTPC Ltd. stopped 38% of its generation capacity. Over 60 crore (600 million) people (nearly half of India's population), in 22 out of 28 states in India, were without power.

More than 300 intercity passenger trains and commuter lines were shut down as a result of the power outage. The worst affected zones in the wake of the power grid's collapse were Northern, North Central, East Central, and East Coast railway zones, with parts of Eastern, South Eastern and West Central railway zones. The Delhi Metro suspended service on all six lines, and had to evacuate passengers from trains that stopped mid-journey, helped by the Delhi Disaster Management Authority.

About 200 miners were trapped underground in eastern India due to lifts failing, but officials later said they had all been rescued.

The National Disaster Management Authority (NDMA), not normally mandated to investigate blackouts, began to do so because of the threat to basic infrastructure facilities like railways, metro rail system, lifts in multi-storey buildings, and movement of vehicular traffic.

The following states were affected by the grid failure:
 states on the northern grid: Delhi, Haryana, Himachal Pradesh, Jammu and Kashmir, Punjab, Rajasthan, Uttar Pradesh, Uttarakhand
 states on the eastern grid: Bihar, Jharkhand, Odisha, West Bengal, Sikkim
 states on the northeast grid: Arunachal Pradesh, Assam, Manipur, Meghalaya, Mizoram, Nagaland, Tripura

The following regions were not directly affected by the power outage:
 Narora, Renukoot and Simbhaoli in Uttar Pradesh
 parts of Delhi such as Badarpur
 areas served by Sterlite and Ib Thermal Power Station (most of western Odisha)
 most of the Kolkata municipal area (CESC system)

As of 2 August, Uttar Pradesh was being supplied about 7 GW power, while the demand was between 9 and 9.7 GW.

Prior disaster-proofing 
Before the grid collapse, the private sector spent $29 billion to build their own independent power stations in order to provide reliable power to their factories. The five biggest consumers of electricity in India have private off-grid supplies. Indian companies have 35 GW of private off-grid generation capacity and plan to add another 33 GW to their off-grid capacity.

Reactions 
On the day of the collapse, Power Minister Sushilkumar Shinde ordered a three-member panel to determine the reason for the failure and report on it in fifteen days. In response to criticism, he observed that India was not alone in suffering major power outages, as blackouts had also occurred in the United States and Brazil within the previous few years.

Washington Post described the failure as adding urgency to Indian Prime Minister Dr. Manmohan Singh's plan for a US$400 billion overhaul of India's power grid. His plan calls for a further 76 gigawatts of generation by 2017, produced in part by nuclear power.

Rajiv Kumar, secretary general of the Federation of Indian Chambers of Commerce and Industry (FICCI) said, "One of the major reasons for the collapse of the power grid is the major gap between demand and supply. There is an urgent need to reform the power sector and bring about infrastructural improvements to meet the new challenges of the growing economy."

On 1 August 2012, newly appointed Power Minister Veerappa Moily stated, "First thing is to stabilize the grid and it has to sustain. For that we will work out a proper strategy." He declined to blame specific states, saying, "I don't want to start with the blame game."

Team Anna, the supporters of anti-corruption activist Anna Hazare, charged that this grid failure was a conspiracy to suppress the indefinite fast movement started on 25 July 2012 for the Jan Lokpal Bill and targeting Sharad Pawar.

Some technology sources and United States Agency for International Development (USAID) proposed that another widespread outage could be prevented by integrated network of microgrids and distributed generation connected seamlessly with the main grid via a superior smart grid technology, which includes automated fault detection, islanding and self-healing of the network.

Investigation 
The three-member investigation committee consisted of S. C. Shrivastava, A. Velayutham and A. S. Bakshi, and issued its report on 16 August 2012. It concluded that four factors were responsible for the two days of blackout:
 Weak inter-regional power transmission corridors due to multiple existing outages (both scheduled and forced);
 High loading on 400 kV Bina–Gwalior–Agra link;
 Inadequate response by State Load Dispatch Centers (SLDCs) to the instructions of Regional Load Dispatch Centres (RLDCs) to reduce over-drawal by the Northern Region utilities and under-drawal/excess generation by the Western Region utilities;
 Loss of 400 kV Bina–Gwalior link due to mis-operation of its protection system.

The committee also offered a number of recommendations to prevent further failures, including an audit of the protection systems.

See also 

 Electricity sector in India
 Northeast blackout of 2003
 Power outage

References

External links 
 Official report of the enquiry committee 

2012 disasters in India
2012 industrial disasters
Economic history of India (1947–present)
India
Electric power in India
July 2012 events in India
2012 in Indian economy